In Dec 2020, over 80 children from the Madrasa of Hizburrahim Islamiyya were kidnapped in Katsina, Nigeria. They were rescued by pro-government vigilantes after a siege and subsequent gun battle with the kidnappers.

In addition to the 80 children rescued, an additional 33 children who had been kidnapped earlier were freed by vigilantes.

Responsibility 
Boko Haram claimed to be behind the abductions, but critics said the organization was not telling the truth. Local politicians instead laid blame on bandits, and were agreed with by experts.

Notes

References

Kidnapping in Nigeria

Nigerian bandit conflict